The 1946 Macdonald Brier, the Canadian men's national curling championship, was held from March 4 to 7, 1946 at Saskatoon Arena in Saskatoon, Saskatchewan. Saskatoon was supposed to host the 1943 Brier, which was cancelled due to the onset of World War II and was promised they would host the next Brier once the competition was resumed. This was the first Brier in which total attendance was recorded, which came to 22,000.

The event was opened by Saskatchewan Premier Tommy Douglas. For the first time ever, games were broadcast live across the country on CBC Radio. Doug Smith and Bill Good did the commentary.

For the first time since the 1928 Brier, there was a three-way tie for first place after round robin play as Alberta, Manitoba, and Northern Ontario all finished with 7-2 records. Team Alberta, who was skipped by Billy Rose captured the Brier Tankard by defeating both Manitoba and Northern Ontario in the tiebreaker playoff. This was Alberta's fourth Brier championship overall.

This was the second straight Brier in which there were no extra ends.

Event Summary
In the first edition of the Brier since 1942, the 1946 edition would prove to be one of the most exciting Brier finishes to date. Through six draws, there were six teams that had a shot at winning the Brier as Manitoba, Northern Ontario, and Ontario were all 5-1, Alberta and Saskatchewan were 4-2, and British Columbia stood at 3-3 with the next draw (Draw 7) featuring three matchups between those six teams. In that draw, British Columbia stayed alive with a 9-8 win over Ontario, Alberta defeated Northern Ontario 8-4, and Manitoba defeated Saskatchewan 10-8. In the eighth draw, British Columbia beat Manitoba 12-10 while Northern Ontario picked up a 10-7 win over Ontario. Alberta and Saskatchewan won their matches over Nova Scotia and New Brunswick respectively.

Heading into the final draw (Draw 9), all six teams were within one game of each other as Alberta, Manitoba, and Northern Ontario were all 6-2 and British Columbia, Ontario, and Saskatchewan were all 5-3. With British Columbia and Saskatchewan drawn against one another in the final draw, there was a possibility of a five-way tie for the Brier championship. For that scenario to take place, the British Columbia/Saskatchewan winner would need Ontario to defeat Alberta and have both Manitoba and Northern Ontario to lose. A win by any of the 6-2 teams would eliminate all five win teams from contention and would ensure at least a spot in the tiebreaker playoff or even winning the championship outright if two of the three six win teams lost.

In the end, Alberta, Manitoba, and Northern Ontario won their matches as all three teams finished round robin play with 7-2 records, necessitating a tiebreaker playoff between those three teams. This was the second time that three teams were tied after round robin play, with the first being in 1928.  Unlike the previous three-way tiebreaker playoff (which was a round robin between the three tied teams), this one only featured a semifinal and final. In the ensuing draw, Northern Ontario drew the bye while Alberta and Manitoba played in the semifinal with the winner playing Northern Ontario in the final.

In the semifinal, Alberta trailed Manitoba 6-2 after the sixth end, but Alberta scored five points in the next four ends to take a 7-6 lead heading into the final two ends. Manitoba tied the game in the eleventh end but Alberta scored one in the final end to win 8-7. In the final between Alberta and Northern Ontario, Alberta held a 6-4 lead after eight ends. Northern Ontario scored one in the ninth and stole one in the tenth to tie the game at 6 with two ends remaining. Alberta scored one in the eleventh to take the lead and sealed the Brier Tankard with a steal of one in the final end for an 8-6 victory. The game started after 10pm, and lasted over four and a half hours.

Teams
The teams are listed as follows:

Round-robin standings

Round-robin results

Draw 1

Draw 2

Draw 3

Draw 4

Draw 5

Draw 6

Draw 7

Draw 8

Draw 9

Playoffs

Semifinal

Final

References 

Macdonald Brier, 1946
Macdonald Brier, 1946
The Brier
Curling in Saskatoon
Macdonald Brier
Macdonald Brier